Silviu Casandra (born October 27, 1975) is a male race walker from Romania.

Doping
Casandra tested positive at Gran Premio Cantones in Spain 16 March 2002 and received a two-year doping ban.

Achievements

References

 

1975 births
Living people
Doping cases in athletics
Romanian sportspeople in doping cases
Romanian male racewalkers